Pseudohaetera is a Neotropical butterfly genus from the subfamily Satyrinae in the family Nymphalidae. The genus was described by F. Martin Brown in 1943.

Species
 Pseudohaetera hypaesia (Hewitson, 1854)
 Pseudohaetera mimica (Rosenberg & Talbot, 1914)

References

Haeterini
Nymphalidae of South America
Butterfly genera